Japonicrambus is a genus of moths of the family Crambidae.

Species
Japonicrambus bilineatus (Okano, 1957)
Japonicrambus ishizukai Okano, 1962
Japonicrambus mitsundoi Sasaki & Jinbo, 2002

References

Crambinae
Crambidae genera